No. 432 Squadron RCAF was a squadron of the Royal Canadian Air Force formed during the Second World War.

History
It was first formed at RAF Skipton-on-Swale in May 1943, as part of No. 6 Group of RAF Bomber Command. The unit was equipped with Wellington Mk.X bombers.

The squadron deployed to RAF East Moor in mid-September, equipping with Lancaster Mk.IIs in October. In February 1944 they changed to Halifax Mk.IIIs, upgrading these to Halifax Mk.VIIs in July.

As part of a Royal Canadian Air Force public relations plan, the town of Leaside officially "adopted" No. 432 Squadron RCAF. Formed and adopted on 1 May 1943 the squadron took the town's name as its nickname, becoming 432 "Leaside" Squadron RCAF. The sponsorship lasted the duration of the war.

The squadron was disbanded at East Moor in May, 1945.

On October 1, 1954, it was reformed as a fighter squadron at CFB Bagotville flying the Canadian designed Avro CF-100. The squadron was again disbanded on October 15, 1961.

Manuel Sharko and Jack Stacy were mid-upper gunners in their respective Halifax bombers during the war.

References

Book Reference: The East Moor Experience by Brian Shields

External links

  

  

  

    

   

Royal Canadian Air Force squadrons
Canadian Article XV squadrons of World War II
Military units and formations established in 1943
Military units and formations disestablished in 1961